The AGROunion (AU) is a conservative agrarianist political movement in Poland formed by Michał Kołodziejczak AGROunia criticizes the actions of current politicians in relation to the state of agriculture in Poland and organizes agricultural protests and information campaigns.

History
Michał Kołodziejczak (pl), born in 1988, is a young farmer who was elected in the 2014 elections to the Błaszki municipal council, as a Law and Justice candidate. He was expelled from the party in 2015 for organizing protests.

In 2018, Kołodziejczak created the Vegetable-Potato Union, which organized protests against the government's policy of massive culling of the pork livestock to fight the african swine fever virus. Soon afterwards, on 7 December, the AGROunia association was established.

On 13 March 2019, a protest took place in Zawisza Square in Warsaw, where straw and tires were burned, hundreds of kilos of apples, manure and pig heads were scattered, demanding that 50 percent of products in stores be of Polish origin. In connection with this event, the head of AGROunia heard allegations of destruction of property.

In 2021, the organization blocked roads, demanding a change in government policy towards agriculture.

The movement organized farmers' protests in 2021.

On 4 December 2021, Agrounia organized a convention in which representatives of left-wing circles such as Piotr Ikonowicz and people associated with communist and pro-Russian circles appeared.

On 7 February 2023, the leader of the AGROunia, Michał Kołodziejczak, and the president of the Agreement party, Magdalena Sroka, announced their intention to merge AGROunia with the Agreement into a joint political party.

Program
AGROunia's goal is to try to influence the government through protests, so that their demands, which are aimed at helping farmers, are passed. The organization is in favor of defending the domestic market and family farms. In addition, it wants Polish farmers to provide the country with food security and healthy food. Michał Kołodziejczak believes that it is important to take over the agricultural self-government - according to him, agricultural chambers are expensive and do not cause adequate development in agriculture, therefore they should be replaced by independent structures of farmers exerting an influence on the rulers. The farmers associated with the organization support the determination of the required number of Polish products in supermarkets and demand strict compliance with the standards of labeling food with the flag of origin.

AGROunia specified its assumptions in the following postulates:
 Polish food as a priority in stores;
 Accurate labeling of Polish food;
 Opposition to discrimination against Polish farmers in Europe;
 Prohibition of liquidating profitable branches of agriculture and breeding;
 Opposition to oligopolies and monopolies;
 The purchase of agricultural goods by the state, and in the event of an economic crisis, the state should cover the losses of the farmer.
 Supporting drug liberalisation

It has been compared to the Samoobrona movement led by the late Andrzej Lepper in the 2000s. It seeks to compete with the Polish People's Party, which under Władysław Kosiniak-Kamysz's leadership beginning in 2015 has moved from its traditional constituency of farmers, to defend economical liberalism and a "rational center".

See also

Self-Defence of the Republic of Poland
Polish People's Party

References 

Political parties in Poland
Political parties established in 2018
Agrarian parties in Poland
Conservative parties in Poland
Trade unions in Poland